Galina Penkova, née Yencheva (born 18 May 1958, in Veliko Tarnovo) is a retired Bulgarian sprinter who specialized in the 400 metres.

She finished eighth in the 4 × 400 metres relay at the 1983 World Championships, with teammates Svobodka Damyanova, Rositsa Stamenova and Katya Ilieva.

Her personal best time was 51.66 seconds, achieved in July 1983 in Sofia.

References
sports-reference

1958 births
Living people
Bulgarian female sprinters
Athletes (track and field) at the 1980 Summer Olympics
Olympic athletes of Bulgaria
Olympic female sprinters
Friendship Games medalists in athletics
People from Veliko Tarnovo
Sportspeople from Veliko Tarnovo Province
21st-century Bulgarian women
20th-century Bulgarian women